Oleg Vladimirovich Blokhin, or Oleh Volodymyrovych Blokhin (born 5 November 1952), is a former Ukrainian and Soviet football player and manager. Regarded as one of the greatest footballers of his generation, Blokhin was formerly a standout striker for Dynamo Kyiv and the Soviet Union.

He holds the all-time top goalscorer record for both Dynamo Kyiv (266 goals) and the Soviet Union national team (42 goals), as well as being the overall top goalscorer in the history of the Soviet Top League (211 goals). He is also the only player to have been capped over 100 times for the Soviet Union and holds Dynamo's appearance record with 582 appearances during his 18-year spell at the club. With Dynamo, Blokhin won eight Soviet league titles, five national cups and two European Cup Winners' Cups. He also competed for the Soviet Union at the 1972 and 1976 Olympic Games and 1982 and 1986 FIFA World Cups. During his playing career he won the Soviet Footballer of the Year award three times and the Ukrainian Footballer of the Year award nine times (both records). In 1975, he was named European Footballer of the Year, winning the Ballon d'Or, becoming the second Soviet and the first Ukrainian player to achieve such a feat.

As a coach, he has had two spells in charge of the Ukraine national team, managing the team at the 2006 FIFA World Cup and UEFA Euro 2012.

In 2011, Blokhin, together with Igor Belanov and Vitaliy Starukhin were named as "the legends of Ukrainian football" at the Victory of Football awards.

Early life 
Blokhin was born in Kyiv, the capital of the Ukrainian SSR, in 1952. His mother Kateryna Adamenko was multiple champion of USSR in the pentathlon, sprint and long jump. He was born to a Russian father and Ukrainian mother. His father Vladimir Blokhin was a police officer, a World War II veteran, and a competitive sprinter. Owing to his parents, Blokhin quickly mastered sprint, and by the age of 16 ran 60 m in less than 7 seconds, and 100 m in 11.0 seconds.

Playing career 
Blokhin was one of the greatest players in the world throughout the 1970s, hitting the target regularly through a period of great success at his hometown club Dynamo Kyiv and becoming the greatest goalscorer in the history of the Soviet League, which was one of Europe's strongest. Normally a forward or winger, Blokhin was most renowned for possessing exceptional pace.

Blokhin played during most of his career for Dynamo Kyiv, becoming the USSR national championship's all-time leader and goalscorer with 211 goals, as well as making more appearances than any other player with 432 appearances. He won the championship 8 times. He led Dynamo to the UEFA Cup Winners' Cup in 1975 and 1986, scoring a goal in each final. Blokhin is also the USSR national football team's most capped player with 112 caps, as well as their all-time leading goalscorer with 42 goals; he played in the 1982 and 1986 FIFA World Cups where he scored one goal in each. He was one of the first Soviet players to play abroad, signing for Austria's Vorwärts Steyr in 1988, he also played in Cyprus with Aris.

In 1979 Blokhin played a couple of games for Ukraine at the Spartakiad of the Peoples of the USSR.

Coaching career 
After retiring as a player, Blokhin coached Greek clubs Olympiacos (Under him they won the Greek Cup and the Greek Super Cup in 1992), PAOK, AEK Athens, and Ionikos.

He began serving as the head coach of the Ukraine national team in September 2003. Under his leadership, Ukraine qualified for a major tournament for the first time as an independent nation, reaching the 2006 FIFA World Cup in Germany. Ukraine reached the quarter-finals of the tournament, losing to eventual champions Italy. Following the side's failure to reach UEFA Euro 2008, Blokhin stepped down as coach on 6 December 2007.

On 14 December 2007, he was named head coach of FC Moscow. The club finished 9th (from 16) and after the season ended Blokhin was fired from the club. At the end of the season, Blokhin announced that if he knew how things would go in FC Moscow, he would have never signed there. This was because the club released many important players without Blokhin's permission yet still had many high expectations. Others said that the reason Blokhin failed in FC Moscow was that he and the press didn't have a friendly relationship, and because of that the press was constantly attacking Blokhin and that damaged his status among the players.

On 21 April 2011, Blokhin was again appointed head coach of the Ukraine national team. He led the team in UEFA Euro 2012 on home soil, beating Sweden but exiting at the group stage after defeats to France and England.

On 25 September 2012, Dynamo Kyiv signed Blokhin to lead the club for the next four years. His final matches in charge of Ukraine were World Cup qualifiers against Moldova and Montenegro in October 2012. Blokhin was dismissed as Dynamo's manager by the club's President Ihor Surkis on 17 April 2014 because of the "unsatisfactory results of the team". The day before, in a press conference after Dynamo had lost a match against Shakhtar Donetsk, Blokhin had already stated that he had decided to resign. Under his leadership Dynamo never qualified (a rare occasion for the club) for the UEFA Champions League and performed poorly in the UEFA Europa League. In his first year his team finished third in the Ukrainian Premier League and in his second year (when he was fired) Dynamo was seven points behind Ukrainian Premier League leaders Dnipro Dnipropetrovsk and Shakhtar Donetsk.

Politics 
In 1998 Blokhin was elected to Verkhovna Rada (Ukraine's parliament) for Hromada. He joined Hromada while still being a member of the Communist Party of Ukraine. In 2002, Blokhin was elected to Verkhovna Rada for a second term. In October 2002, he joined the United Social Democratic Party of Ukraine.

Family 
Blokhin's father, Vladimir Ivanovich Blokhin, is a native of Moscow, a veteran of the World War II, survivor of the Leningrad blockade, and a former Soviet law enforcement agent. Vladimir Blokhin later worked as a sports functionary for the Soviet Dynamo Society. Blokhin's mother Katerina Zakharivna (née Adamenko) is from a village in Borodianka Raion. She originally worked at a Kyiv sewing factory, but eventually discovered hidden athletic talents and became the Soviet champion in track and field as well as pentathlon. After retiring from sports, she became a staff member at one of Kyiv's universities.

Blokhin was married to Irina Deriugina, a top coach and former world champion in rhythmic gymnastics, but the couple divorced in the early 1990s. Blokhin and Deriugina have a daughter, singer Iryna Blokhina, who wrote and performed the Euro 2012 anthem.

Blokhin and his second wife, Angela, have two daughters, Hanna (born 2001) and Katerina (born 2002).

Career statistics

Club

 The statistics in USSR Cups and Europe is made under the scheme "autumn-spring" and enlisted in a year of start of tournaments

International

Scores and results list the Soviet Union's goal tally first, score column indicates score after each Blokhin goal.

Managerial statistics

Honours
Dynamo Kyiv
 Soviet Top League (8): 1971, 1974, 1975, 1977, 1980, 1981, 1985, 1986
 Soviet Cup: 1974, 1978, 1982, 1984–85, 1986–87
 USSR Super Cup: 1981, 1986, 1987
 UEFA Cup Winners Cup: 1974–75, 1985–86
 UEFA Super Cup: 1975; Runner-up: 1986

Individual

 Merited Master of Sports (1975)
 Merited Coach of Ukraine (2005)
 Ballon d'Or: 1975
 IOC European Footballer of the Season: 1974–75
 Golden Foot: 2009, as a legend
 Soviet Footballer of the Year: 1973, 1974, 1975
 Ukrainian Footballer of the Year (9): 1972, 1973, 1974, 1975, 1976, 1977, 1978, 1980, 1981
 Soviet Top League top scorer: 1972, 1973, 1974, 1975, 1977
 Soviet Top League All-Time Goals and Appearances Leader
 Soviet Cup All-Time Goals
 UEFA Cup Winners' Cup 1985–86 top scorer
 European Cup 1986–87 second place on top scorers list.
 USSR national football team All-Time Goals and Caps Leader
 Ukraine's Golden Player representative
 The best 33 football players of the Soviet Union (15): No. 1 (1972—1982, 1985, 1986), No. 2 (1983, 1984)
 Club Loyalty Award: 1986
 IFFHS Legends

Ballon d'Or
 1974 – 19th
 1975 – 1st
 1976 – 19th
 1981 – 5th

See also
 List of top international men's football goalscorers by country
 List of men's footballers with 100 or more international caps
 Oleh Blokhin club

References

External links

 
 
 

1952 births
Living people
Footballers from Kyiv
1982 FIFA World Cup players
1986 FIFA World Cup players
2006 FIFA World Cup managers
UEFA Euro 2012 managers
AEK Athens F.C. managers
Aris Limassol FC players
Cypriot First Division players
FC Dynamo Kyiv players
Dynamo sports society athletes
Ballon d'Or winners
FIFA Century Club
Association football forwards
Footballers at the 1972 Summer Olympics
Footballers at the 1976 Summer Olympics
Olympiacos F.C. managers
PAOK FC managers
Olympic bronze medalists for the Soviet Union
Olympic footballers of the Soviet Union
Soviet expatriate footballers
Soviet footballers
Soviet Union international footballers
Soviet Top League players
UEFA Golden Players
Ukrainian expatriate footballers
SK Vorwärts Steyr players
Expatriate footballers in Austria
Ukrainian expatriate sportspeople in Austria
Soviet expatriate sportspeople in Austria
Expatriate footballers in Cyprus
Ukrainian expatriate sportspeople in Cyprus
Soviet expatriate sportspeople in Cyprus
Ukrainian football managers
Ukrainian footballers
Ukraine national football team managers
Ukrainian sportsperson-politicians
Ukrainian people of Russian descent
FC Moscow managers
Russian Premier League managers
Super League Greece managers
Expatriate football managers in Greece
Expatriate football managers in Russia
Ukrainian expatriate sportspeople in Greece
Ukrainian expatriate sportspeople in Russia
Ionikos F.C. managers
Hromada (political party) politicians
Social Democratic Party of Ukraine (united) politicians
Communist Party of Ukraine politicians
Third convocation members of the Verkhovna Rada
Fourth convocation members of the Verkhovna Rada
Olympic medalists in football
FC Dynamo Kyiv managers
Merited Coaches of Ukraine
Honoured Masters of Sport of the USSR
Ukrainian Premier League managers
Ukrainian expatriate football managers
Medalists at the 1976 Summer Olympics
Medalists at the 1972 Summer Olympics
Recipients of the Order of Prince Yaroslav the Wise, 2nd class